Corentin de Chatelperron, born in Vannes in 1983, is a French engineer, adventurist and manager of the "Gold of Bengal" project.

Career 

After general engineering studies of ICAM he worked 3 years in the ecotourism and aeolian sector.

Early in 2009 he went to Bangladesh to work in a modern shipyard producing fiberglass composite boats, the Taratari shipyard. Rapidly he thought of replacing the fibreglass (which is a polluting, expensive and imported material) with jute fiber, a natural local resource.

So as to show the potential of the jute composite and to find partners, he built the sailboat Tara Tari (40% jute fiber, 60% fiberglass) and decided to come back to France on board. This six-month journey at sea, later called the "Tara Tari adventure" was a big success. With several partners, Corentin de Chatelperron launched "Gold of Bengal", a research project on the uses of jute fibre as a composite reinforcement. For 3 years, an eight-person team has been developing this innovation for Bangladesh (research, prototyping, technology transfer). This research project gave birth, in March 2013, to a second boat, "Gold of Bengal"  made entirely in Bangladesh with 100% jute composite.

Corentin de Chatelperron is a member of the Society of French Explorer and a scientific consultant for the French Sustainable School of Design.

Documentaries 
•	«Gold of Bengal, un voilier 100% jute», Voiles et Voiliers 2013

•	«Corentin de Chatelperron un pionnier Shamengo», Kaïa Production, Shamengo

•	«Je traverse les océans sur un bateau en fibre de jute», Kaïa Production, Shamengo

Publications 
«The Tara Tari Adventure», Les Editions Découvrance, 2011

Awards 
Prix Avenir de l'Institut Français de la Mer
Prix Bernard Moitessier 2011
Mention speciale du Prix de la Toison d'Or du livre d'aventure vécue 2011
Prix Aventure du Crédit Agricole de Cosne-sur-Loire 2012
Prix Pierre Loti 2012
Prix René-Caillié 2012

Conferences 
«Jute do it!», Tedx Paris, December 2012

References

French engineers
1983 births
Living people
People from Vannes